The Voyah Dreamer is an all-electric and plug-in hybrid minivan produced by Voyah, which launched on the Chinese car market in March 2022.

Overview

The Voyah Dreamer was first presented at the 2021 Guangzhou Auto Show, showing a prototype of a large and luxurious minivan with 2+2+3 seating setup. The Dreamer rides on the Electric Smart Secure Architecture (ESSA) of Dongfeng which is shared with the Voyah Free. 

For the interior, the Voyah Dreamer is equipped with individual seats featuring heating, cooling, and massaging functions. The dashboard has a three-screen layout and a floating center console with hidden large storage compartments underneath.

Specifications
(0-62 mph) in 5.9 seconds.

References

Voyah Dreamer
Minivans
Production electric cars
Cars introduced in 2021
Cars of China
Hybrid electric cars
Plug-in hybrid vehicles